Arenós Reservoir is a reservoir in Puebla de Arenoso and Montanejos, Castellón, Land of Valencia, Spain.

References 

Reservoirs in the Valencian Community
Reservoirs in Spain